An undesigned coincidence (so-named by J.J. Blunt and first discovered by William Paley) occurs when an account of one event omits a piece or pieces of information which is filled in, seemingly coincidentally, by a different recording, which helps to answer inquiries raised by the first. Undesigned coincidences often occur when one account forgoes a reason for an action which is given by a different account (which often does not mention that action). Evangelists use undesigned coincidences to argue that there was a complex unified story both authors are writing down despite gathering data from different witnesses.

Perspectives

Criticism 
The arguments for the reliability of the New Testament from undesigned coincidences have been criticized as merely implying that the Gospel authors developed their work by sharing information from the same source literature. This source has been often referred to as the Q source.

Advocacy 
Evangelists will often claim that account  relies on information from account , but account  also relies on account  (or some larger example of that using all four accounts of the Gospels).

Examples in the New Testament 

 The Jews knew that Jesus was going to destroy the temple and restore it in three days (Mark 15:29) because he told them (John 2:19).
 James and John were mending their nets (Matthew 4:21) because Jesus’ miracle producing fish broke the nets (Luke 5:6), even though Matthew makes no mention of this miracle whatsoever. The miracle in Luke also fits with the eagerness of the disciples to follow Jesus in Matthew 4:19-20.
 Paul's example of Cephas as one who led around a sister or a wife (1 Corinthians 9:5) is confirmed by the incidental mention of Peter's mother-in-law in Matthew 8:14.
 People brought the sick and possessed to Jesus in the evening (Matthew 8:16) because it was on the Sabbath (Mark 1:21; Luke 4:31), and because it was not lawful to heal on the Sabbath (Matthew 12:10).
 Peter was recognised by the maid (Matthew 26:71) possibly because the ‘other disciple’ spoke to her (John 18:16). Note the different implied ways of describing the location and the girl.
 Jesus was mocked primarily at the beginning of the crucifixion (Mark 15:29-32; Luke 23:36), which might be explained by the darkness from the sixth to the ninth hour (Matthew 27:45; Mark 15:33), which might have caused the change in attitude towards Jesus.
 Peter entered the tomb first (John 20:5-8) probably because most of the disciples were scared of spirits (e.g. Matthew 14:26), while Peter had always been rash and bold (e.g. Matthew 14; John 18; John 21; Acts 5:18,29; 12:3).
 Luke mentions that Christians were first called ‘Christians’ in Antioch (Acts 11:26). It is unclear why he would think this important unless Christians usually went by another name. This fits with the fact that ‘Christian’ is only mentioned on two other occasions in the New Testament (Acts 26:28; 1 Pet 4:16), and that they are usually otherwise called something else: ‘all that believed’ (Acts 2:44); ‘the disciples’ (Acts 6:1); followers of ‘the way’ (Acts 9:2; 18:26; 19:9; 22:4).
 Paul's mentioning to Timothy about there being evil men, sorcerers and deceivers, while Timothy was in Ephesus (2 Tim 3:13) fits with Luke's mention of the book-burning of those engaged in ‘curious arts’ (Acts 19:19).
 Jesus needed to prophecy who was hitting Him (Matthew 26:67-68) because He was blindfolded (Luke 22:64).
 Jesus healed Malchus’ ear (Luke 22:51) because Peter cut it off (John 18:10).
 Jesus asked Phillip, who was from Bethsaida (John 12:21, John 1:44), where to buy bread (John 6:5), because they were currently in Bethsaida (Luke 9:10).
 Jesus condemned Bethsaida for not responding to miracles (Matthew 11:21) (despite no previous Bethsaida miracles mentioned in Matthew) because the miracle of feeding 5,000 took place in Bethsaida (Luke 9:10).
 Jesus instructed the blind man not to enter Bethsaida (Mark 8:22-26) because He condemned it (Matthew 11:21).
 There was lots of grass (John 6:10) that was green (Mark 6:39) because it was Passover (John 6:4) (which is consistent with our knowledge of seasons).
 The 5,000 men were counted (Matthew 14:21) by separating them into groups of 100 people (Mark 6:39-40, Luke 9:14-15) that were men (John 6:10-11).

Examples in the Pentateuch 

 Abraham interceded for Sodom (Genesis 18) probably because his nephew, Lot, lived there (Genesis 14:12).
 The Amalekites attacked Israel (Ex 17) plausibly because Moses had acquired water (cf. Gen 21:25; 26:22; Ex 2:17; Num 20:17; 21:22; Deut 2:6; Judges 5:11) – this might explain why the Amalekites were particularly destroyed later, since they specifically aimed to steal miraculous water, indicating complete irreverence for God.
 Moses’ invitation Hobab, the son of Moses’ father-in-law, to journey with them (Numbers 10:29-33) seems to have been accepted (Judges 1:1).
 The defiled men in Numbers 9 are plausibly Mishael and Elizapahan, who carried Nadab and Abihu's bodies out of the Tabernacle (Lev 10:4). Numbers 9:1 suggests this is the same Passover, and since the censuses excluding Levites either side of the Tabernacle's erection had the same number of men, it is unlikely that a non-Levite had died.

References

Further reading 

 Manning, Erik. "Undesigned Coincidences in the Gospels: Surprising Evidence for Jesus’ Feeding of the 5000 | Is Jesus Alive?" Is Jesus Alive?, 7 Aug. 2019, isjesusalive.com/undesigned-coincidences-in-the-gospels-surprising-evidence-for-jesus-feeding-of-the-5000/.
 Guest. "Undesigned Coincidences in the Scriptures: An Argument for Their Veracity (Part 1) — Old Testament Examples." Cross Examined, 27 July 2022, crossexamined.org/undesigned-coincidences-in-the-scriptures-an-argument-for-their-veracity-part-1-old-testament-examples/.
 Conway, Bobby. "799. What Are Undesigned Coincidences?" YouTube, 26 Oct. 2015, www.youtube.com/watch?v=L3SmRkiBcec.
 Lisa Loraine Baker. "Is There Evidence for Undesigned Coincidences Supporting Biblical Truth?" Biblestudytools.com, 2013, www.biblestudytools.com/commentaries/csb-apologetics/is-there-evidence-for-undesigned-coincidences-supporting-biblical-truth.html.
 View. "Undesigned Coincidences and New Testament Reliability – Seeking Truth." Seekingtruth.ph, Sept. 2022, www.seekingtruth.ph/uncategorized/undesigned-coincidences-and-new-testament-reliability/.
 Influence2. "How Undesigned Coincidences Support the Gospels’ Reliability." Influence2, 31 Mar. 2017, influencemagazine.com/reviews/how-undesigned-coincidences-prove-the-gospels-reliability. ‌

Biblical studies